Richard Alfred Erdlitz (February 16, 1920 in Menominee Township, Michigan – April 3, 2006 in Melbourne, Florida) was an American football running back in the National Football League and All-America Football Conference. He played for the Philadelphia Eagles in 1942 and 1945 and for the Miami Seahawks in 1946. He played college football and college baseball at Northwestern.

College career
While playing college football for the Northwestern Wildcats, Erdlitz earned All-Western Conference honors. He was invited to play in the College All-Star Game as the starting quarterback for the College All-Stars on August 28, 1942.

Erdlitz also played college baseball at Northwestern.

Professional career

Philadelphia Eagles
Erdlitz played for the Philadelphia Eagles in 1942.

Coaching career
In 1943, Erdlitz was an assistant coach at Miami Edison High School.

References

1920 births
People from Menominee County, Michigan
Sportspeople from Oshkosh, Wisconsin
Players of American football from Michigan
Players of American football from Wisconsin
American football running backs
American football quarterbacks
Northwestern Wildcats football players
Philadelphia Eagles players
Miami Seahawks players
2006 deaths